Pap (– 374/375) was king of Armenia from 370 until 374/375, and a member of the Arsacid dynasty. His reign saw a short, but notable period of stabilization after years of political turmoil. Although Armenia had been conquered and devastated by the Sassanid king Shapur II in 367/368, Pap was restored to the throne at a young age with Roman assistance in 370. Early in his reign, Armenia and Rome won a joint victory over the Persians at the Battle of Bagavan, and some former territories of the kingdom were reconquered by the efforts of his  (general-in-chief) Mushegh Mamikonian. Although Pap's reign began with a reconciliation of the monarchy, nobility and church, his relations with the church soon deteriorated. Pap allegedly had the Patriarch of Armenia, Nerses I, poisoned, although some later historians doubt this narrative. Pap also eventually ran afoul of the Romans, who suspected him of colluding with the Persians. The emperor Valens unsuccessfully attempted to assassinate him in 373/374, but ultimately succeeded in having him killed in 374/375. He was succeeded by his nephew Varazdat as king.

Pap is depicted with hostility by the classical Armenian historians, likely due to the king's troublesome relationship with the Armenian Church. The Roman historian Ammianus Marcellinus, however, praised Pap for his bravery and cleverness. Some later Armenian historians have reevaluated Pap positively, valuing his attempts to strengthen the Armenian monarchy and pursue an independent foreign policy under difficult circumstances.

Family
Pap was the son of the Arsacid king of Armenia Arshak (Arsaces) II and his wife Parandzem. The exact year of Pap's birth is not known for certain and has been debated by historians; one source gives it as approximately 353. Armenian historian Hakob Manandian considered it possible that Pap was actually the son of Parandzem by her first husband Gnel (Arshak's nephew). Pap also appears to have had a brother or half-brother whose son Varazdat succeeded Pap as king. This brother is not mentioned by name in the histories of Faustus of Byzantium or Movses Khorenatsi, two of the main Armenian sources on Pap's life, but another Armenian work, the anonymous Vita of St. Nerses, reports that Pap had a younger brother named Trdat.

Pap's name is of Middle Iranian origin and literally means "father".

Ascendance to the throne
Around 367/368, Pap's father Arshak II went to Persia for peace negotiations with the Sassanid king Shapur II and was imprisoned, leaving the Armenian throne vacant. According to Ammianus Marcellinus, the Persian invasion force was commanded by two Armenian defectors, Cylaces (Glak) and Artabanes (Artavan or Vahan). Faustus also mentions two Armenian  (magnates), Meruzhan Artsruni and Vahan Mamikonian (possibly identifiable with Ammianus's Artabanes), in leadership positions under Shapur II's suzerainty, as well as Zik and Karen who carried Persian noble titles. Shapur II may have intended to combine Sassanid administrative rule (Zik and Karen) with that of  rule (Artsruni and Mamikonian).

During the siege, Arshak II's wife Parandzem appealed to Cylaces and Artabanes in the name of her husband. The two men defected back to the Arsacid monarchy and engineered the escape of Pap. Themistius reported Pap's arrival at Valens' court in Marcianopolis, where the emperor was wintering. According to Faustus, Pap was in contact with his mother while in Roman territory and encouraged her to await his return. Valens sent him to stay at Neocaesarea in Pontus Polemoniacus,  from the Armenian border, where Pap received "liberal support and education." In 369, at the request of  Mushegh Mamikonian (according to Faustus) or of Cylaces and Artabanes (according to Ammianus), Valens allowed Pap to return to Armenian territory. He was accompanied by the  Terentius but was not yet recognized as King of Armenia by the Romans.

King of Armenia

Valens was reluctant to bestow a royal title upon Pap as this would violate an earlier treaty signed by Jovian in July 363, whereby Rome had pledged not to intervene in Armenian affairs. Nevertheless, Shapur was enraged at Pap's restoration and personally invaded Armenia in response, forcing Pap to leave Armenia again and go into hiding near the Roman frontier in Lazica. Instead of going after Pap, Shapur II concentrated his attack on Artogerassa, which fell in the winter of 369/70. The royal treasure was captured by the Persians and Parandzem was raped and murdered. Shapur II also began systematically persecuting the local Christians, destroying churches, erecting fire temples and forcing conversion to Zoroastrianism.

Shapur II contacted Pap while he was in hiding and tried to persuade him to come over to his side. Under Shapur II's influence, Pap murdered the duplicitous Cylaces and Artabanes and sent their heads to the shahanshah as a sign of loyalty. Shapur's attempted rapprochement with Pap was aborted, however, by Arinthaeus's return to Armenia with a Roman army that restored Pap to the throne for a second time in approximately spring 370. In the spring of 371, Shapur II launched another massive invasion of Armenia. In response, Valens sent a force headed by his generals Traianus and Vadomarius into Armenia. The Armenian army also assembled under the command of  Mushegh Mamikonian. The joint Roman-Armenian force met the invading Persian army in the region of Bagrevand and emerged victorious at the Battle of Bagavan. Faustus of Byzantium gives considerable credit for the victory to Mushegh Mamikonian and writes that Pap observed the battle from the nearby height of Mount Npat. During the ensuing battles, more Armenian territories were reclaimed from the Persians (according to Faustus), including Arzanene and Corduene, which had been ceded to the Persians by Jovian in 363. By the end of the summer, Shapur II had retreated to his capital at Ctesiphon and Valens had returned to Antioch. Shapur II was unable to confront the massive Roman buildup in Armenia as a result of his preoccupation with Kushan attacks in the eastern part of his empire. Thus, Roman control over Armenia through the client king Pap was secure for the time being.

Pap was a young man—likely still a teenager—when he took the throne. At the beginning of his reign, he invited Patriarch Nerses I to return to Armenia. Nerses agreed and undertook the restoration of Armenia's churches and church institutions, caring for the poor and reestablishing the church's influence in the country. Meanwhile,  Mushegh campaigned to restore Arsacid authority in Armenia, brutally punishing the provinces that had revolted against the monarchy, forcing the pro-Persian  to submit to royal authority, and retaking territories from neighboring Albania and Iberia. Mushegh destroyed the fire temples erected by Shapur throughout the kingdom and persecuted those that had apostasized to Zoroastrianism. Soon after these initial successes, Pap came into conflict with Patriarch Nerses. According to Faustus, Nerses constantly reprimanded Pap for his sinful behavior and refused to allow him to enter the church; Movses Khorenatsi implies that Pap was upset at Nerses for having him return lands that had been confiscated from the nobility during his father's reign. Some modern historians believe that Pap clashed with the church due to his support for Valens's pro-Arian religious policy; others believe that Pap was a Christian in name only and that he was sympathetic towards Zoroastrianism. Still others regard Pap's conflict with the clergy as the result of his steps to restrain the excessive power of the church, which had accumulated significant estates and wealth in the form of the charitable institutions created by Nerses during Arshak II's reign.

The conflict between the king and the patriarch came to a head in 373, when, according to Faustus and Movses, Pap invited Nerses to dinner at his mansion in the village of Khakh and had him poisoned. Pap nominated a man named Yusik as a replacement and sent him for consecration in Caesarea, but the Bishop of Caesarea Basil refused to consecrate the nominee. Valens requested that Basil quickly resolve the situation by finding a new nominee acceptable to Pap. Basil failed to do so and the Roman see of Caesarea effectively lost its traditional role of consecrating the Patriarch of Armenia. According to Faustus, the poisoning of the popular and powerful patriarch caused a rift between the king and the nobility and alienated  Mushegh in particular. Nerses had also been a close Roman contact; his murder and the subsequent loss of Roman ecclesiastical control over the appointment of the Patriarch of Armenia must have damaged Pap's relations with Valens.

Some later historians have cast doubt on or totally rejected the assertion that Pap had Nerses poisoned. The Armenian historian Leo considered it a legend that was presented as fact by later ecclesiastical historians seeking to defame Pap. Authors Malachia Ormanian and Yeghiazar Muradian, judging from the circumstances described by Faustus, thought it more likely that Nerses died of some illness of the lungs or heart, perhaps on the same day or the day after he had dinner with Pap, giving rise to the rumor that the patriarch had been poisoned. Josef Markwart and Hakob Manandian also reject the story of Nerses's poisoning, arguing that Pap would have surely been called to account for it by Basil of Caesarea. Nina Garsoïan and Noel Lenski, on the other hand, do not dispute that Pap poisoned Nerses and note that he was not the first Arsacid king to have a patriach murdered, in reference to Pap's grandfather Tiran who had Patriarch Yusik assassinated. Ammianus Marcellinus is notably silent on Nerses's murder. This may reflect the Roman historian's general disinterest in religious matters, although it has been suggested that Ammianus deliberately omitted this episode in order not to diminish his narrative of Pap as "the innocent victim of Roman villainy."

Fall
In addition to the controversy over the appointment of a new patriarch, Pap's relations with Valens further suffered due to the Roman commander Terentius, who wrote to the emperor criticizing Pap and advising him to depose the Armenian king in order to prevent him from defecting to Persia. According to Faustus, Pap also demanded control over Caesarea and twelve other Roman cities including Edessa as former Arsacid domains while openly courting Persia, in defiance of the warnings of  Mushegh and other nobles not to break the alliance with Rome. Ammianus, on the contrary, claims that Pap was completely loyal to Rome. Valens decided to have Pap executed, and invited him to a meeting in Tarsus in 373 or 374. Pap arrived with 300 mounted escorts, but quickly became worried by the absence of the emperor, who was still in Antioch, and therefore fled back toward Armenia and fought off a legion that was sent after him.

The generals gave the excuse that Pap had used magical powers to avoid capture and used a dark cloud to mask his party, which is reminiscent of Faustus's claim that Pap was possessed by demons. This could have simply been an attack on Pap's character based on his sympathies towards Arians and pagans. Ammianus writes that Pap's subjects joyfully greeted their king's return, and that even after this assassination attempt Pap did not turn against the Roman Empire. A barbarian guard murdered Pap in 374 or 375 during a banquet which Traianus had organized for the young king. Ammianus describes the murder of Pap on Valens's orders as an unjustified and treacherous act, drawing parallels with the murder of the Quadi King Gabinius by Valentinian I and claiming that the ghost of Pap haunted many.

The Armenian  still loyal to Pap did little to protest the murder of the king because of the large Roman army present in Armenian territory. The new Roman nominee for king, Pap's nephew Varazdat (Varasdates), was accepted by virtually everyone. Varazdat had grown up in Rome and began to rule under the regency of Mushegh Mamikonian, as the Mamikonians were the chief pro-Roman noble house in Armenia. Shapur II had long been courting Pap and the latter's murder and replacement with a Roman nominee provoked Persian outrage; however, Shapur did not invade and took only diplomatic action.

Marriage and issue
Pap married an Armenian noblewoman called Zarmandukht, who bore him two sons: Arshak (Arsaces) III and Vagharshak (Vologases). Pap's sons were later made co-rulers of Armenia by  Manuel Mamikonian after he forced Pap's successor Varazdat to flee the country.

Historiography
The classical Armenian historians are hostile to Pap and ascribe to him an array of sins, chief among which being the murder of Nerses I. Faustus of Byzantium, drawing from epical sources, depicts Pap as totally evil and possessed by demons from birth, which caused him to commit sins such as sodomy and bestiality. This attitude toward Pap has been explained by the king's troublesome relationship with the Armenian Church, caused by his promotion of Arianism and efforts to limit the church's power and influence. The Roman historian Ammianus Marcellinus, who, unlike the classical Armenian historians, was a contemporary of Pap, presents a more favorable image of the young king, whom he praises for his bravery and cleverness and describes as being welcomed “with the greatest joy by his subjects” after escaping the first assassination attempt against him. Later Armenian historians reevaluated Pap in a positive light, considering him an unjust victim of pro-church historians and valuing his attempts to strengthen the Armenian monarchy and pursue an independent foreign policy under difficult circumstances. Several of the "evil deeds" ascribed to Pap by Faustus were reinterpreted as the king's efforts to stabilize and repopulate the war-torn Kingdom of Armenia. Some other modern historians have evaluated Pap less positively. In Noel Lenski's view, Pap likely struggled to rule a kingdom that was still recovering from the destruction wrought by Shapur II, leading him to make poor decisions that ultimately led to his downfall.

Cultural depictions
 Pap is a character in the tragedy Nerses the Great, Patron of Armenia written in 1857, by the 19th-century Armenian playwright, actor and editor, Sargis Vanandetsi (Sargis Mirzayan).
 Pap is the titular character of the historical novel Pap Tagavor by Stepan Zoryan, first published in 1944.

See also
 Stepan Zoryan

References

Notes

Citations

Bibliography

Ancient sources

Modern sources

Further reading

 

374 deaths
4th-century kings of Armenia
4th-century murdered monarchs
Arsacid kings of Armenia